Marvin Kokowleh Blapoh (born 15 January 1998) is a Liberian professional footballer who plays as a midfielder and defender for Liberian First Division club MC Breweries and the Liberia national team.

External links
 
 
 

1998 births
Living people
Sportspeople from Monrovia
Liberian footballers
Association football midfielders
Association football defenders
Monrovia Club Breweries players
Liberian First Division players
Liberia international footballers